is a Japanese female volleyball player who is part of the Japan women's national volleyball team.

She participated in the 2015 FIVB Volleyball World Grand Prix. On club level, she played for Kinrankai Senior Highschool in 2015.

References

External links
http://worldgrandprix.2015.fivb.com/en/preliminary-round-group1/competition/teams/jpn-japan/players/airi-miyabe?id=44904
http://u18.women.2015.volleyball.fivb.com/en/competition/teams/jpn-japan/players/airi-miyabe?id=46146
http://www.scoresway.com/?sport=volleyball&page=player&id=13592
http://www.baseballjapan.org/system/prog/news.php?l=e&i=1036

1998 births
Living people
Japanese people of Nigerian descent
Sportspeople of Nigerian descent
Japanese women's volleyball players
Place of birth missing (living people)
Minnesota Golden Gophers women's volleyball players
Japanese expatriate sportspeople in the United States
Expatriate volleyball players in the United States